"Rickdependence Spray" is the fourth episode of the fifth season of the American television series Rick and Morty. It premiered in the United States on July 11, 2021.

In the episode, Morty notices the hospital's horse breeding program at Beth's workplace, takes an interest in it, and gets a volunteer job at the equine hospital in order to use it to masturbate. A week later, Rick borrows a barrel of "horse semen" from the hospital to create a biological weapon to use on the underground race of cannibalistic horse people called "chuds" he and Morty are fighting. Due to the challenging plot lines, some suspected it to be a series of dares issued by or placed on the show's writer's room. The episode was not well received by critics and fans alike, with the episode the lowest rated Rick and Morty episode on IMDB. Many criticized the episode's plot as overly far-fetched and silly.

Plot 
Rick's attempt to make a bioweapon to use against an underground race of cannibalistic horse-people (the "Chuds") goes awry when he uses a barrel of horse semen in his experiment which, unbeknownst to Rick, also contains Morty's semen. The failed experiment results an explosion which unleashes a swarm of giant, mutated sperm that begin attacking and murdering humans. 

Eventually a plan is devised and set in motion by the president to lure the mutated sperm with an enlarged, human egg harvested from Summer. However, unknown to everyone who contributed to the plan, the sperm originated from Morty. After Morty confesses the truth and everybody realizes that they are about to create a "giant incest baby", the President orders his forces to defend the egg from the sperm at all costs. One lone sperm unexpectedly breaches the egg, fertilizing it. The President, who forbids outright destroying the egg for political reasons, instead has it launched into space.

Production

Reception
The episode was poorly received, and is frequently ranked amongst the worst episodes of the show.

References

External links 
 

Rick and Morty episodes
2021 American television episodes